Living Without Your Love is the eleventh studio album recorded by singer Dusty Springfield, and tenth released. The album was recorded in summer 1978 and released in early 1979.

Background

While Living Without Your Love was produced by session musician David Wolfert instead of Roy Thomas Baker, it was another no-expenses-spared Los Angeles production, recorded with more or less the same session musicians as the previous album and partly in the same studios. Living Without Your Love failed to chart in the US nor the UK.

The album was originally titled Never Trust a Man in a Rented Tuxedo and then also had slightly risqué cover art, picturing a near naked Springfield coming out of a hotel room shower, only covering herself up with a towel and a man in a tuxedo leaving the room. These plans were however shelved and the album was instead issued under the name Living Without Your Love and new cover art.

Touring
The track chosen to promote the album in the UK was the ballad "I'm Coming Home Again", a cover of a song released on Gladys Knight's first solo album the year before. The single was released simultaneously with the announcement that Springfield was to embark on a month-long UK tour, her first live dates in Britain in more than six years. When she arrived in the UK, however, she was met by the news that all concerts in the provinces had been cancelled due to poor ticket sales. Springfield subsequently made an appearance on UK TV wearing a black veil, jokingly saying she was "in mourning because all my dates have been cancelled". She also made a playback performance singing "I'm Coming Home Again", with the comment that the lyrics perhaps weren't as relevant any longer.

Springfield did play two live dates at London's Drury Lane Theatre, and one charity concert at the Royal Albert Hall in the presence of Princess Margaret, which all sold-out and were major successes. However, during the Albert Hall concert Springfield made the off-the-cuff remark "I am glad to see that the royalty isn't confined to the box", a tongue-in-cheek reference to her large homosexual following and the drag queens in the audience. The Princess took this as a personal insult, and later sent the singer a typewritten apology to the Queen which Springfield was made to sign and return.

The publicity about the cancelled homecoming tour, and the Albert Hall debacle, didn't help her record sales in the UK. Living Without Your Love consequently became her last LP recorded for Phonogram, a company with which she had been associated, in various forms (Fontana Records/Philips Records/Mercury Records), for nearly twenty years. Two non-album singles produced by David Mackay were recorded and released in the UK that same year. "Baby Blue", written and co-produced by Trevor Horn, Geoff Downes, and Bruce Woolley, was a disco-pop track, which was also issued as an extended 12" single and became a minor club hit (No. 61), but "Your Love Still Brings Me to My Knees" never charted and the track became Springfield's swan song for Phonogram.

Release
In 2002, Mercury/Universal Music released Living Without Your Love on CD for the first time.

An edited version of the 1979 concert at the Royal Albert Hall was released on both CD and DVD by Eagle Rock in 2005.

Reception

Reviewing in Christgau's Record Guide: Rock Albums of the Seventies (1981), Robert Christgau wrote: "Fledgling producer David Wolfert doesn't get [Springfield's] voice as subtly as Roy Thomas Baker (or Jerry Wexler) did, but he gives her more good songs than she's had in a decade. Also more good sides: one, featuring a 'You've Really Got a Hold on Me' that vies with Smokey's, and 'Closet Man,' which is about what it sounds like and nice indeed."

Track listing
Side A
"You've Really Got a Hold on Me"  (Smokey Robinson) – 3:49
"You Can Do It" (Evie Sands, Richard Germinaro, Ben Weisman) – 4:12 
"Be Somebody" (Melissa Manchester, Vini Poncia, John Vastano) – 3:24
"Closet Man" (David Foster, Donny Gerrard, Eric Mercury) – 4:09
"Living Without Your Love" (Steve Nelson, David Wolfert) – 3:36

Side B
"Save Me, Save Me"  (Albhy Galuten, Barry Gibb) – 3:06
"Get Yourself to Love"  (Douglas McCormick) – 4:06
"I Just Fall in Love Again"  (Steve Dorff, Larry Herbstritt, Harry Lloyd, Gloria Sklerov) – 3:14
"Dream On" (Franne Golde, Dennis Mayoff, Carole Bayer Sager) – 3:32
"I'm Coming Home Again"  (Bruce Roberts, Carole Bayer Sager) – 3:44

Personnel
 Dusty Springfield – vocals, background vocals
 Dianne Brooks – background vocals
 Patti Brooks – background vocals
 Brenda Russell – background vocals
 Ed Greene – drums
 Lenny Castro – percussion
 Gary Coleman – percussion, vibraphone
 Will Lee – bass guitar
 Scott Edwards – bass
 Dennis Budimir – guitar
 David Wolfert – guitar
 Jay Graydon – guitar
 Neil Larsen – keyboards
 Lincoln Mayorga – keyboards
 Jai Winding – keyboards
 Ian Underwood – synthesizer
 Michael Canahan – saxophone
 David Leull – baritone saxophone
 Tom Saviano – alto, soprano & tenor saxophone
 Dick Hyde – trombone
 Steve Madaio – trumpet, flugelhorn, horn
 Harry Bluestone – concert master
 Nick DeCaro – musical conductor
 Gene Page – musical conductor

Production
 David Wolfert – record producer, horn arrangements, rhythm arrangements
 Dusty Springfield – associate producer
 Charles Koppelman – executive producer
 Myles Chase – rhythm arrangements
 Nick DeCaro – string arrangements
 Gene Page – string arrangements
 Tom Saviano – horn arrangements, rhythm arrangements
 Al Schmitt, Jr. – sound engineer
 Sheridan Eldridge – engineer
 John Weaver – engineer
 John H.R. Mills – engineer, remixing
 Mike Reese – mastering
 Frank DeCaro – contractor
 Joe Black – co-ordination
 Linda Gerrity – production co-ordination
 Bill Burks – art direction, design
 Roger Wake – digital remastering (2002 reissue)
 Mike Gill – executive producer (2002 reissue)
 Paul Howes – liner notes (2002 reissue)

Sources

 Howes, Paul (2001). The Complete Dusty Springfield.
 Liner notes, Dusty Springfield: Living Without Your Love (2002 re-issue), Mercury Records/Universal Music 586 005-2. 
 Liner notes, Dusty Springfield: Live at the Royal Albert Hall, Eagle Rock EAGCD310, GAS 0000310 EAG, ER20081-2 (CD), EV 30133-9 (DVD), 2005.

Dusty Springfield albums
1979 albums
Albums arranged by Gene Page
Mercury Records albums
United Artists Records albums